Monitorix is a computer network monitoring tool that periodically collects system data and uses the web interface to show the information as graphs. Monitorix allows monitoring of overall system performance, and can help detect bottlenecks, failures, unusually long response times and other anomalies.

One part of the tool is a collector, called monitorix. This Perl daemon is started automatically like any other system service. The second program of Monitorix is a CGI script (monitorix.cgi). Since version 3.0 Monitorix has its own HTTP server included, what makes installing an own web server unnecessary.

Monitorix is free software licensed under the terms of the GNU General Public License version 2 (GPLv2) as published by the Free Software Foundation. It uses the RRDtool (written by Tobi Oetiker) and is written in Perl.

See also

 RRDtool
 Collectd
 Munin
 Comparison of network monitoring systems

References

Further reading

External links

 

Internet Protocol based network software
Network management
Free software programmed in Perl